The Boston Celtics Radio Network is a radio network that broadcasts Boston Celtics basketball games with a flagship station of WBZ-FM (98.5). Carried in 5 of the 6 New England states, the network has 27 stations (17 on AM, 10 on FM).

From 2005 until 2013, Celtics games had been carried on Entercom-owned stations WRKO and WEEI. That partnership ended in August 2013. In September 2013, the Celtics announced that they had signed a multi-year deal with CBS Radio to broadcast games on their network. CBS Radio and Entercom merged in 2017.

Radio Network (26 stations + 2 FM translators)

Flagships (1 station)
98.5 WBZ-FM: Boston

Affiliates (25 stations + 2 FM translators)

Maine (6 stations)
92.9 WEZQ: Bangor Boston Bruins primary affiliate
96.3 WJJB-FM: Gray
1310 WLOB: Portland
95.9 WPEI: Saco
95.5 WPPI: Topsham
1440 WRED: Westbrook

Massachusetts (7 stations + 1 FM translator)
105.5 WWEI: Easthampton
1400 WHTB: Fall River (if there is a conflict on WSAR)
1480 WSAR: Fall River
1280 WPKZ: Fitchburg
105.3/W287BT: Fitchburg (rebroadcasts WPKZ)
1230 WNAW: North Adams Boston Bruins primary affiliate
95.1 WXTK: West Yarmouth Boston Bruins primary affiliate
1440 WVEI: Worcester

New Hampshire (8 stations + 1 FM translator)
1230 WTSV: Claremont Boston Bruins primary affiliate
1450 WKXL: Concord
103.9/W280EC: Concord
1270 WTSN: Dover
1400 WTSL: Hanover Boston Bruins primary affiliate
1250 WGAM: Manchester
101.5 WWLK-FM: Meredith Boston Bruins primary affiliate
900 WGHM: Nashua
93.5 WEEY: Swanzey Boston Bruins primary affiliate

New York (2 stations)
101.3 WCPV: Essex
960 WEAV: Plattsburgh

Rhode Island (2 stations)
790 WPRV: Providence (2018-)
1240 WOON: Woonsocket (2009, 2014-)

Former stations (20 stations + 1 FM translator)

Former flagships (7 stations)
680 WRKO: Boston, Massachusetts (1981-1991, 1995–1996, 2005–2007)
590 WEEI Boston, Massachusetts (1991-1995)
850 WHDH: Boston, Massachusetts (co-flagship, 1952–1969)
850 WEEI: Boston, Massachusetts (2007-2013)
1510 WWZN: Boston, Massachusetts (2001-2005)
93.7 WEEI-FM: Lawrence, Massachusetts (2011-2013)
94.5 WHDH-FM: Boston, Massachusetts (co-flagship, 1952–1969; sometimes carried Celtics games alone when WHDH was carrying a game of the Boston Bruins hockey club))

Former affiliates (16 stations + 1 FM translator)
620 WZON: Bangor, Maine
1280 WFAU: Gardiner, Maine
1450 WVOM: Rockland, Maine
1440 WRED: Westbrook, Maine
1320 WARA: Attleboro, Massachusetts (1990-1991, 2005–2006 season (as WARL))
104.9 WBOQ: Gloucester, Massachusetts
1420 WBSM: New Bedford, Massachusetts
560 WHYN: Springfield, Massachusetts
94.9 W235AV: Tatnuck (relays WTAG)
580 WTAG: Worcester, Massachusetts
107.7 WTPL: Hillsborough
1420 WASR: Wolfeboro, New Hampshire
920 WHJJ: Providence, Rhode Island (2015-2018)
620 WVMT: Burlington, Vermont
1240 WSKI: Montpelier, Vermont
96.1/WDEV-FM: Warren, Vermont
550 WDEV: Waterbury, Vermont
93.9 WWOD: Woodstock, Vermont

References

External links
The Celtics Radio Network affiliates page on CBSBoston.com
Boston Celtis 98.5 The Sports Hub Announce Multi Year Broadcast Partnership

Radio Network
National Basketball Association on the radio
Sports radio networks in the United States